The 2021–22 Colorado State Rams women's basketball team represents Colorado State University in the 2021–22 NCAA Division I women's basketball season. The Rams, led by tenth year head coach Ryun Williams, play their home games at Moby Arena, and are members of the Mountain West Conference. They finished the season 21–12, 9–9 in Mountain West play to finish in 6th place in the conference. The Rams advanced to the championship game of the Mountain West women's basketball tournament, beating 11 seed San Jose State, 
and upsetting 3 seed Wyoming  and 2 seed New Mexico, before falling short to 1 seed UNLV 75–65 in the championship. The Rams earned an invite to the 2022 WNIT, where they fell to Portland in the 1st round, 72–63.

Roster

Statistics

Schedule

|-
!colspan=9 style="background:#00674E; color:#FFC44F;"| Exhibition

|-
!colspan=9 style="background:#00674E; color:#FFC44F;"| Non-conference regular season

|-
!colspan=9 style="background:#00674E; color:#FFC44F;"| Mountain West regular season

|-
!colspan=9 style="background:#00674E;"| Mountain West Women's Tournament

|-
!colspan=9 style="background:#00674E;"| WNIT

References 

Colorado State
Colorado State Rams women's basketball seasons
Colorado State Rams women's basketball
Colorado State Rams women's basketball
Colorado State